Kevin Hodson (born March 27, 1972) is a Canadian former professional ice hockey goaltender.  Hodson played professionally in the NHL and AHL before ending his playing career in the Finnish SM-liiga in 2003–04.

Hodson suffered from Wolff-Parkinson-White syndrome (rapid heart beat) during his time in the NHL, and affectionately earned the nickname "Ticker" from teammates.

Amateur career
As a youth, Hodson played in the 1985 Quebec International Pee-Wee Hockey Tournament with the Winnipeg South Monarchs minor ice hockey team.

Hodson joined the OHL's Sault Ste. Marie Greyhounds during the 1990–91 season.  Hodson backstopped the Greyhounds to their first ever Memorial Cup championship during the 1992–93 season.  Hodson was also selected the top goaltender of the 1993 Memorial Cup tournament.  Even with his strong OHL and Memorial Cup showing, Hodson went undrafted.

Professional career

Chicago
Hodson turned pro in 1992 after signing with the Chicago Blackhawks and spent the 1992–93 season with both his Junior Team and the IHL's Indianapolis Ice, where he posted a 5–9 record.

Detroit
After that season was finished, Hodson signed with the Detroit Red Wings and was sent to their AHL affiliate, the Adirondack Red Wings, for 1993–94 and 1994–95 seasons, as Detroit had enough goaltending depth with Chris Osgood, Mike Vernon, Bob Essensa, Tim Cheveldae, Vincent Riendeau, and Peter Ing alternating goaltending duties at some point during those seasons.  Hodson made his NHL debut with the Detroit Red Wings during the 1995–96 Season, where he shut out the Blackhawks 3–0.  Hodson would go on to post a 2–0–0 record for that year.

During the 1996–97 Season in which the Red Wings would eventually win the Stanley Cup, Hodson remained as the Red Wings' Number 3 Goalie and as such, only saw 6 games that season, posting a 2–2–1 record. Since Hodson spent the majority of the season with the Red Wings, Detroit included his name on the Cup, even though did not officially qualify.

During the off-season, Vernon was traded to the San Jose Sharks, moving Hodson to the backup position for the 1997–98 Season.  Hodson posted a 9–3–3 record in 21 regular season games as the Red Wings won the Stanley Cup for the 2nd straight season.

For the 1998–99 Season, Norm Maracle challenged Hodson for the backup goaltender role in Detroit.  Given Maracle's level of play, Hodson was traded to the Tampa Bay Lightning in a deal that brought Bill Ranford and Wendel Clark to the Red Wings on March 23, 1999.

Tampa Bay
Hodson went 2–1–1 in the five games with Tampa Bay before suffering a groin injury which ended his season.

The 1999–2000 season found Hodson serving as a backup to Dan Cloutier, who was Hodson's backup in 1993 with the Sault Ste. Marie Greyhounds.  Hodson's record in 24 games that year was 2–7–4.  Hodson was assigned to Tampa Bay's minor league affiliate, the Detroit Vipers and was later dealt to the Montreal Canadiens on June 2, 2000 for a seventh round pick in that year's entry draft.

Hodson remained inactive until the 2002–03 season, when he was re-signed by Tampa Bay as the backup goaltender to Nikolai Khabibulin.  Hodson posted a 0–3–1 record in seven games with Tampa Bay that season.

On January 15, 2003, Tampa Bay made a trade with the Boston Bruins that brought goaltender John Grahame to the team as Khabibulin's new backup.  Rather than accept reassignment to the minors, Hodson announced his retirement from on January 16, 2003.

Career in Europe
On November 6, 2003, Hodson was signed as a free agent by Jokerit of the Finnish SM-liiga, where he posted a 1–1-1 record before leaving the team in mid-season.

After hockey
Kevin Hodson returned to Sault Ste. Marie, Ontario and earned a Bachelor of Business Administration Degree from Algoma University. Hodson began a career as a financial advisor with Edward Jones, and in 2012 left the firm to join with RBC Dominion Securities.

Awards
Memorial Cup Tournament All-Star Team (1993)
 Member of 1992–93 Memorial Cup Champion Sault Ste. Marie Greyhounds
 Member of 1996–97, 1997–98 Stanley Cup Champion Detroit Red Wings
 Outstanding Goalie Hap Emms Memorial Trophy (Memorial Cup 1993)
 1993 OHL All-star team

Career statistics

Regular season and playoffs

References

External links
 
 Kevin Hodson at hockeygoalies.org
 Kevin Hodson at goaliesarchive.com
 Kevin Hodson at DetroitHockey.Net
 Kevin Hodson's page at RBC Dominion Securities

1972 births
Living people
Adirondack Red Wings players
Algoma University alumni
Canadian ice hockey goaltenders
Detroit Red Wings players
Detroit Vipers players
Indianapolis Ice players
Ice hockey people from Winnipeg
Jokerit players
Quebec Rafales players
Sault Ste. Marie Greyhounds players
Stanley Cup champions
Tampa Bay Lightning players
Undrafted National Hockey League players
Winnipeg South Blues players
Canadian expatriate ice hockey players in Finland